is a Buddhist temple head one of fourteen autonomous branches of the Rinzai school of Zen Buddhism, founded in 1397 by the lord of Mihara; Kobayakawa Haruhira; its first Abbot was Buttoku Daitsu Zenji. The temple is named after its honorary founder, the Chinese master Buttsu Zenji. Located in Mihara, Hiroshima Prefecture, Japan, the temple is head of the Buttsū-ji branch of Rinzai Zen, governing forty-seven temples.

See also 
 For an explanation of terms concerning Japanese Buddhism, Japanese Buddhist art, and Japanese Buddhist temple architecture, see the Glossary of Japanese Buddhism.

Notes

References

Buddhist temples in Hiroshima Prefecture
Buttsū-ji temples
 
1390s establishments in Japan